Langdon Park is a Docklands Light Railway (DLR) station in Poplar in Greater London, England. The station is between All Saints and Devons Road stations on the Stratford-Lewisham Line. Construction of the infill station began on 17 November 2006, and the first day of operation was 9 December 2007.

History and proposals 
When planning the Stratford branch of the Docklands Light Railway, two station sites were safeguarded to be used much later when the system was developed. One of these stations was Pudding Mill Lane, which opened in 1996. The other station was provisionally called Carmen Street. This was changed to Langdon Park, following the name of the adjacent Langdon Park School as well as a local park.

Proposals for design of Langdon Park were first drawn up in 2000 but due to lack of funding, amongst other things, the scheme was dropped. In May 2000, Leaside Regeneration Limited and Docklands Light Railway Limited (DLRL) jointly funded preliminary feasibility work looking at locations, outline costs and Docklands Light Railway implications of a new station between the existing All Saints and Devons Road DLR stations, which had one of the longest gaps in the DLR network. The research indicated that the best and most practical location would be at the pedestrian bridge linking Carmen Street on Lansbury Estate and Bright Street adjacent to Langdon Park itself.

In June 2005, DLRL re-engaged consultants to reassess the scheme costs and design with a view to developing the project for a planning application submission.  Following the successful outcome of a bid for funding from the Office of the Deputy Prime Minister (ODPM), the predecessor department of Communities and Local Government, planning permission was applied for and subsequently granted.  Construction took just over a year and cost £10.5 million. The Mayor of London presided over the station opening ceremony on 10 December 2007, although the station actually came into public use the day before.

Design 
The station has  platforms connected by a lightweight transparent replacement bridge link from Carmen Street and Hay Currie Street that were all pre-fabricated off-site and lifted into position over two weekends to reduce service disruption.

The station is fully accessible from street level and the bridge has two lift shafts at either end to provide access to the station.

The station was designed by Consarc Architects.

The station features three art installations by British artist Kate Davis. These include Whoosh, a large word sculpture clearly visible from either platform.

Connections
The station is directly served by London Buses routes 108 and indirectly by the 309. Additionally the 108 has a 24-hour service.

References

External links

Station Facilities: Langdon Park, Transport for London
Langdon Park at DLR Project Archives

Docklands Light Railway stations in the London Borough of Tower Hamlets
Railway stations in Great Britain opened in 2007
Poplar, London